Sankarapuram is a Town Panchayat of Kallakurichi district in the southern Indian state of Tamil Nadu

Theatres
NVN Theatre 

Barkath Theatre.

Schools in sankarapuram
 Government Boys Higher secondary  School
 Government Girls Higher Secondary School
 Oxford metric higher secondary school 
 New Power metric higher secondary  School
 Joseph Academy metric higher secondary school 
Jayam Matric higher secondary School 
Chakra vidyalaya CBSE school vada semapalayam

Transportation

Road 

SH-6 Kallakurichi - Sankarapuram -Tiruvannamalai Road

SH-68  Sankarapuram  - Thirukovilur-Cuddalore Road

SH-135 Sankarapuram-Kachirayapalayam-Kallakurichi

Rail
Nearest Railway Station are

 ChinnaSalem 34 km
 Tirukoilur 43 km
 Tiruvannamalai 50 km

Villages in Sankarapuram
There are total of 192 villages in sankarapuram taluk before chinnasalem and kalvarayan Taluk creation. Sankarapuram Taluk was largest taluk before trifurcation into chinnasalem and kalvarayan taluks. The list of villages of sankarapuram taluk is available here

Nearby Cities 
Salem-118 km
Chennai-237 km
Trichy-180 km
Coimbatore-278 km
Tiruvannamalai - 46 km
Kallakurichi -  18 km
Bangalore -248 km
Tirupati - 251 km
Thirukoilur -37 km

Buses Available for top Cities from Sankarapuram 
1. Bangalore
2. Tirupathi
3. Chennai
4. Salem
5. Cuddalore 
6. Hosur
7. Krishnagiri
8. Tiruvannamalai
9. Kallakurichi
10. Tirukoilur

References

http://www.census2011.co.in/data/town/803437-sankarapuram.html
https://sankarapuram.com
https://sankarapuram.com/search-shop/?search_keywords=&search_location=&search_categories%5B%5D=132&search_radius=50&search_lat=0&search_lng=0

Cities and towns in Kallakurichi district